Sleepy is an original novel written by Kate Orman and based on the long-running British science fiction television series Doctor Who. It features the Seventh Doctor, Bernice, Chris and Roz. It is part of the "Psi Powers series".

Synopsis
The Earth colony Yemaya 4 is struck by a plague that causes the colonists to manifest psychic powers. The Doctor and his companions become heavily involved. Some of the group contract the plague, while others travel back in time to try to find out how it started. Meanwhile, murderous agents threaten to simply kill every innocent person involved.

External links
The Cloister Library - Sleepy

1996 British novels
1996 science fiction novels
British science fiction novels
Novels by Kate Orman
Virgin New Adventures
Seventh Doctor novels
Novels set in the 23rd century